Roberto Bautista Agut defeated Filip Misolic in the final, 6–2, 6–2 to win the singles tennis title at the 2022 Generali Open Kitzbühel.

Casper Ruud was the reigning champion, but withdrew before the tournament.

Seeds
The top four seeds receive a bye into the second round.

Draw

Finals

Top half

Bottom half

Qualifying

Seeds

Qualifiers

Lucky losers

Qualifying draw

First qualifier

Second qualifier

Third qualifier

Fourth qualifier

References

External links
 Main draw
 Qualifying draw

Generali Open Kitzbühel - Singles
2022 Singles